Scopula aspilataria is a moth of the family Geometridae. It was described by Francis Walker in 1861. It is found in Sri Lanka.

Description
The male is creamy colored with blackish frons. Wings irrorated (sprinkled) with a few black scales. Forewings with antemedial, and both wings with medial, postmedial, submarginal, and marginal very slightly waved bands of a darker tint than the ground color. A series of minute marginal black specks can be seen.

References

Moths described in 1861
aspilataria
Moths of Sri Lanka